The Fields is a 2011 American suspense thriller directed by Tom Mattera and Dave Mazzoni. The film is touted as being a "semi-autobiographical account" of what happened to Harrison Smith, the film's writer, as a boy growing up on a grandparents' farm on the outskirts of Easton, Pennsylvania. The film stars Cloris Leachman and Tara Reid. Filming wrapped in October 2009, and the film played in festivals in Fall 2011.

Plot
The film takes place in a small Pennsylvania town in 1973, and tells the story of a young boy (Joshua Ormond) and his family (Tara Reid, Faust Checho, Cloris Leachman, Bev Appleton) as they are terrorized by an unseen presence in the surrounding fields.

As a young boy, Steven deals with a very difficult home life, as his parents are constantly at odds. After a potentially dangerous incident, Steven's mother sends him to stay with his grandparents on their farm for a few weeks. Soon after he arrives, an unseen presence begins terrorizing the farmhouse, using the massive surrounding cornfields to remain hidden.

Cast

Production

The film was produced by Faust Checho with Mr. Big Productions, in association with MazWa Productions. Tommy Lee Wallace was attached as an associate producer. Production spanned six weeks, throughout September and October 2009, and was shot on location in the Pocono Mountains region in Bartonsville, Pennsylvania and in Kunkletown, Pennsylvania. Some scenes were filmed in one of the oldest amusement parks in America, Bushkill Park, originally opened in 1902.

Release
The film was anticipated to be released in late 2011, it was finally released on April 24, 2012 in the USA on DVD and Blu-ray by Breaking Glass Pictures.

References

External links
 
Official USA distributor, Breaking Glass Pictures
 
 

2011 films
2011 horror films
2011 independent films
2010s mystery films
2011 psychological thriller films
American independent films
American horror thriller films
Films set on farms
Films set in Pennsylvania
Films set in 1973
Films shot in Allentown, Pennsylvania
Films shot in New Orleans
American mystery films
2010s English-language films
2010s American films